The 2020–21 Luge World Cup was a multi race tournament over a season for Luge, organised by the FIL. The season started 28 November 2020 in Innsbruck, Austria, and concluded on 6 February 2021 in St. Moritz, Switzerland.

Calendar

Results

Men's singles

Women's singles

Doubles

Team relay

Standings

Men's singles Overall

Final standings after 12 events
(*Champion 2020)

Men's singles

Final standings after 9 events

Men's singles Sprint 

Final standings after 3 events
(*Champion 2020)

Women's singles Overall

Final standings after 12 events
(*Champion 2020)

Women's singles

Final standings after 9 events

Women's singles Sprint 

Final standings after 3 events
(*Champion 2020)

Doubles Overall

Final standings after 12 events
(*Champion 2020)

Doubles

Final standings after 9 events

Doubles Sprint 

Final standings after 3 events
(*Champion 2020)

Team Relay 

Final standings after 5 events
(*Champions 2020)

Medal table

Points

References

External links 

 FIL streaming service

2020-21
2020 in luge
2021 in luge